San Pasqual is a census-designated place in Los Angeles County, California. It lies between San Marino and Pasadena. The major streets in San Pasqual are San Pasqual Street, South Sierra Madre Blvd., and Oakdale Street. San Pasqual is served by the Pasadena post office responsible for ZIP code 91107, and thus locations there are properly addressed with the final line reading "Pasadena, CA 91107". The population was 2,041 at the 2010 census.

The name comes from the Rancho San Pascual, of which San Pasqual is one of the remaining unincorporated areas.

Geography
According to the United States Census Bureau, the CDP has a total area of 0.3 square miles (0.7 km), all of it land.

Demographics
At the 2010 census San Pasqual had a population of 2,041. The racial makeup of San Pasqual was 1,344 (65.9%) White (54.6% Non-Hispanic White), 63 (3.1%) African American, 7 (0.3%) Native American, 438 (21.5%) Asian, 1 (0.0%) Pacific Islander, 104 (5.1%) from other races, and 84 (4.1%) from two or more races. Hispanic or Latino of any race were 362 people (17.7%).

The whole population lived in households, no one lived in non-institutionalized group quarters and no one was institutionalized.

There were 909 households, 228 (25.1%) had children under the age of 18 living in them, 426 (46.9%) were opposite-sex married couples living together, 75 (8.3%) had a female householder with no husband present, 36 (4.0%) had a male householder with no wife present.  There were 42 (4.6%) unmarried opposite-sex partnerships, and 13 (1.4%) same-sex married couples or partnerships. 301 households (33.1%) were one person and 83 (9.1%) had someone living alone who was 65 or older. The average household size was 2.25.  There were 537 families (59.1% of households); the average family size was 2.89.

The age distribution was 365 people (17.9%) under the age of 18, 120 people (5.9%) aged 18 to 24, 656 people (32.1%) aged 25 to 44, 617 people (30.2%) aged 45 to 64, and 283 people (13.9%) who were 65 or older.  The median age was 41.3 years. For every 100 females, there were 91.8 males.  For every 100 females age 18 and over, there were 90.5 males.

There were 961 housing units at an average density of 3,767.3 per square mile, of the occupied units 533 (58.6%) were owner-occupied and 376 (41.4%) were rented. The homeowner vacancy rate was 0.7%; the rental vacancy rate was 7.6%.  1,290 people (63.2% of the population) lived in owner-occupied housing units and 751 people (36.8%) lived in rental housing units.

According to the 2010 United States Census, San Pasqual had a median household income of $96,938, with 2.5% of the population living below the federal poverty line.

References 

Census-designated places in Los Angeles County, California
Census-designated places in California